Faadhippolhu Atoll (code name Lhaviyani) is an administrative division of the Maldives. It corresponds to the natural atoll of the same name.

There is an industrial island with tuna canning facilities located at Felivaru.
Some islands on this atoll like Hinnavaru and Naifaru are overpopulated, being completely covered by buildings.
The formerly uninhabited island of Maafilaafushi was resettled in the 1980s in order to relieve the lack of land availability in Malé.

Traditionally, Maldivians call this atoll simply 'Faadhippolhu', without adding the word 'Atholhu' at the end. This is done only with the names of some atolls.

References
 Divehi Tārīkhah Au Alikameh. Divehi Bahāi Tārikhah Khidmaiykurā Qaumī Markazu. Reprint 1958 edn. Malé 1990. 
 Divehiraajjege Jōgrafīge Vanavaru. Muhammadu Ibrahim Lutfee. G.Sōsanī.
 Xavier Romero-Frias, The Maldive Islanders, A Study of the Popular Culture of an Ancient Ocean Kingdom. Barcelona 1999.

Atolls of the Maldives

dv:ފާދިއްޕޮޅު
sk:Faadhippolhu